Theodidaktos (Greek, from theos - 'god', and didaktos - taught) were "the immediate disciples of Ammonius Saccas, who was called Theodidaktos, “God-Taught” – such as Plotinus and his follower Porphyry."

References

Theosophy